Turanica is a genus of moths of the family Noctuidae.

Species
 Turanica haeretica (Püngeler, 1902)

References
Natural History Museum Lepidoptera genus database
Turanica at funet

Cuculliinae